Cleary is an extinct town in Livingston County, in the U.S. state of Missouri. The GNIS classifies it as a populated place.

A post office called Cleary was established in 1845, and remained in operation until 1901. The community possibly derives its name from J. I. McCleery, the proprietor of a local mill.

References

Ghost towns in Missouri
Former populated places in Livingston County, Missouri